Dingman Township is a township in Pike County, Pennsylvania, United States. The population was 12,487 at the 2020 census, up from 11,926 in  2010. The Township was named in honor of Judge Daniel Westbrook Dingman, and was created on April 17, 1832 from part of the former Upper Smithfield township.

History
The Callahan House, Minisink Archeological Site, and Gifford Pinchot House are listed on the National Register of Historic Places.

Geography

Demographics

As of the census of 2010, there were 11,926 people, 4,185 households, and 3,304 families residing in the township. The population density was 204.9 people per square mile (79.4/km2). There were 5,346 housing units at an average density of 91.9/sq mi. The racial makeup of the township was 91.7% White, 3.4% African American, 0.3% Native American, 0.8% Asian, 0.1% Native Hawaiian or Pacific Islander, 1.6% from other races, and 2% from two or more races. Hispanic or Latino of any race were 8.8% of the population.

There were 4,185 households, out of which 37.4% had children under the age of 18 living with them, 66.4% were married couples living together, 8.3% had a female householder with no husband present, and 21.1% were non-families. 16.7% of all households were made up of individuals, and 5.8% had someone living alone who was 65 years of age or older. The average household size was 2.85 and the average family size was 3.22.

In the township the population was spread out, with 26.9% under the age of 18, 61.7% from 18 to 64, and 11.4% who were 65 years of age or older. The median age was 41.1 years.

The median income for a household in the township was $54,866, and the median income for a family was $56,458. Males had a median income of $41,589 versus $26,643 for females. The per capita income for the township was $21,519. About 4.1% of families and 4.2% of the population were below the poverty line, including 5.5% of those under age 18 and 5.9% of those age 65 or over.

Census-designated places
For statistical purposes, the U.S. Census Bureau designates four communities within Dingman Township as CDPs: Conashaugh Lakes, Gold Key Lake, Pocono Woodland Lakes and Sunrise Lake.

References

External links

Official Township Website

Populated places established in 1750
Townships in Pike County, Pennsylvania
Delaware Water Gap National Recreation Area
Townships in Pennsylvania
Towns in the New York metropolitan area
Pennsylvania populated places on the Delaware River